Gyeongseong Creature is an upcoming South Korean television series starring Park Seo-joon, Han So-hee, Soo Hyun, Kim Hae-sook, Jo Han-chul and Wi Ha-joon. Set in the spring of 1945, when Gyeongseong (the old name for Seoul) was in its darkest era, the series depicts the story of people who fight fiercely at the border between life and death. It is scheduled to premiere on Netflix in the fourth quarter of 2023.

On November 3, 2022, a second season was confirmed.

Synopsis 
In Spring 1945 in Gyeongseong, during Japanese rule over Korea, two young adults confront a strange creature born of greed,  and battle against it for survival.

Cast

Main 
 Park Seo-joon as Jang Tae-sang
 A wealthy man and the best informant in Gyeongseong.
 Han So-hee as Yoon Chae-ok
 A specialist in finding missing people.
 Kim Soo-Hyun as Maeda
 The mistress of family that controls the Gyeongseong area.
 Kim Hae-sook as Nawol-daek
 Geumokdang's Butler.
 Jo Han-chul as Yoon Joong-won
 Yoon Chae-ok's father.
 Wi Ha-joon as Kwon Jun-taek
 Jang Tae-sang's close friend and a soldier.

Supporting 
 Ji Woo as Myeong-ja
 A gisaeng from Chunwol-gwan.
 Park Ji-hwan as Gap-pyeong

Production

Filming 
In January 2022, production team confirmed the casting and revealed that the filming is currently in progress.

On March 3, 2022, it was reported that Wi Ha-joon tested positive for COVID-19 and the filming was suspended since the actor was self quarantined. 

On August 3, 2022, it was reported that actress Han So-hee suffered a minor injury to her face, while filming an action scene for Gyeongseong Creature. On August 11, Han's agency confirmed that she has recovered from the injury and will return to filming the following week.

In October 2022, it was reported that Gyeongseong Creature recently finished filming and started post-production.
 
In November 2022, production of the season 2 was confirmed. The filming schedule has yet to be decided.

References

External links 
 
 
 

2023 South Korean television series debuts
Television series by Story & Pictures Media
Television series by Studio Dragon
South Korean thriller television series
South Korean historical television series
South Korean horror fiction television series
2023 web series debuts
South Korean web series
Television series set in 1945
Television series set in Korea under Japanese rule
Korean-language Netflix original programming
Upcoming Netflix original programming
Upcoming television series